The Real McCoys is an American situation comedy starring Walter Brennan, Richard Crenna, and Kathleen Nolan.  Co-produced by Danny Thomas's Marterto Productions in association with Walter Brennan and Irving Pincus's Westgate Company, it was broadcast for six seasons: five by the ABC-TV network, from 1957 to 1962; and a final year, 1962–1963, by CBS. Set in California's San Fernando Valley, it was filmed at Desilu studios in Hollywood.

Synopsis
The Real McCoys concerns the lives of a family originally from the Appalachian Mountains of West Virginia, from a fictional place named Smokey Corners. They relocated to California to live and work on a farm they inherited from a relative. They consist of Grandpa Amos McCoy (Walter Brennan), his grandson Luke (Richard Crenna); Luke's new wife Kate (Kathleen Nolan); Luke's teenage sister Tallahassie "Hassie" (Lydia Reed); and his 11-year-old brother "Little Luke" (Michael Winkelman). The double-naming of the brothers is explained in the first full episode ("Californy, Here We Come"), when the elder Luke introduces Little Luke to Pepino Garcia (Tony Martinez) and says, "Well, you see, in the excitement of having him, Ma and Pa plum forgot they already had me." Only Crenna appeared in all 225 episodes.

The McCoys' farm was previously owned by an uncle, Ben McCoy, who died. The former West Virginians join the Grange farm association, and hire Pepino when he informs them he was Ben's foreman. In the episode broadcast January 8, 1962, Pepino becomes an American citizen and assumes the surname "McCoy." The McMichaels, a brother and sister played by Andy Clyde and Madge Blake in twenty-nine and twenty-one episodes respectively, lived on the hill not far from the McCoys. Amos McCoy and George McMichael, both mischievous, crotchety old men, sometimes quarreled, often about their games of checkers and horseshoes. Kate is friendly with the much older Flora McMichael, George's sister, and becomes involved with life in the community.

Though still in her twenties, Kate serves as a mother figure for Luke's younger siblings, Hassie and Little Luke. One episode shows her bewilderment in trying to entice the children to take responsibility for their school studies. Many episodes have a moral theme consistent with the conservative opinions of Walter Brennan, such as two 1957 segments entitled "You Can't Cheat an Honest Man" with Joseph Kearns, later of the television series Dennis the Menace, and "Gambling Is a Sin", in which Amos allows a casino to advertise on McCoy property before the ethics of the matter is brought to his attention. Other such episodes are "Go Fight City Hall", "The Taxman Cometh", "You Can't Always Be a Hero", "You Never Get Too Old", "Where There's a Will", "Beware a Smart Woman", "Money in the Bank", "How to Win Friends", "You're as Young as You Feel", "Honesty Is the Best Policy", and "Never a Lender Be".

In "Little Luke's Education" (February 6, 1958), Amos confronts bigotry among the local children against hillbilly peoples such as the McCoys. In "Grampa's Private War" (February 12, 1959), Amos gets so enthusiastic with patriotic fervor that he claims to have fought as a soldier commanded by Theodore Roosevelt in the Spanish–American War, but Amos was only seven (Walter Brennan was four) years old when that war was fought during 1898. Then Amos is invited to speak at a Veterans Day ceremony.

Jon Lormer was cast seven times as an actor for The Real McCoys during 1959 and 1960, six as the character Sam Watkins. Joan Blondell appeared three times near the end of the series as Aunt Win. Marjorie Bennett was cast three times as Amanda Comstock. Pat Buttram and Howard McNear also appeared three times; they were subsequently cast as Eustace Haney on CBS's Green Acres and as Floyd the Barber on CBS's The Andy Griffith Show. Olin Howland and Willard Waterman appeared five times each as Charley Perkins and Mac Maginnis, respectively.

Early in the series, Charles Lane, who often appeared in a character role on I Love Lucy, was cast twice as Harry Poulson, a fast-talking egg salesman; Hassie McCoy has an interest in Harry's son. During 1963, Jack Oakie appeared three times in the role of Uncle Rightly. Dick Elliott was cast twice as Doc Thornton, and Lurene Tuttle appeared twice as Gladys Purvis, the widowed mother of series character Kate McCoy, with Jay Novello in one of those appearances as Gladys' intended second husband, a retired photographer from Fresno.

Malcolm Cassell appeared several times as Hassie McCoy's boyfriend, Tommy. Edward Everett Horton (the narrator of Fractured Fairy Tales) played J. Luther Medwick, the grandfather of Hassie's other boyfriend, Jerry; Medwick and Amos soon clash. Verna Felton, a member of the December Bride cast, appeared once as Cousin Naomi Vesper. Jesse White, known later as the actor portraying a Maytag repairman for television commercials and subsequently a cast member of CBS's The Ann Sothern Show, portrayed a used car salesman named "San Fernando Harry" who clashes with Amos in "The New Car" (October 2, 1958). On June 1, 1961, Amos, Luke, and Kate return to West Virginia for the 100th-birthday gathering of "Grandmother McCoy", played by Jane Darwell. In one episode, Lee Van Cleef played a sentry; in another Tom Skerritt appeared as a letter carrier.

The episode "The Tycoon" (August 30, 1960) four years later coincidentally shared the title of Brennan's next ABC sitcom, The Tycoon, with his co-actor Van Williams. Barbara Stanwyck made a cameo appearance in the 1959 episode "The McCoys Go To Hollywood", which also features Dorothy Provine, and a glimpse of the Desilu Studios, where the series was filmed. In 1961, Fay Wray is featured in the episode "Theatre in the Barn", as herself. She volunteers to direct a local amateur production to raise money for the Grange.

Just before The Real McCoys ended as an ABC series, Nolan quit the series due to a contract dispute and was written out of the remaining scripts: her character died, but details were never given. Hassie left home to attend college, and Little Luke joined the United States Army; for the final season she appeared only in the first episode—he never did. Amos McCoy did not appear in the last eleven episodes; he was said to be back visiting family in West Virginia.  Luke was a widower, and many of the stories concerned Grandpa trying to find him a new wife. This nearly succeeded when Luke met Louise Howard, portrayed by Janet De Gore, a widow with a young son, Greg, played by Butch Patrick, later of CBS's series The Munsters, a relationship which continued through the end of the series.

Episodes

Series overview

Season 1 (1957–58)

Season 2 (1958–59)

Season 3 (1959–60)

Season 4 (1960–61)

Season 5 (1961–62)

Season 6 (1962–63)

Home media
Infinity Entertainment released the first four seasons of The Real McCoys on DVD between 2007 and 2010.

On May 7, 2012, it was announced that Inception Media Group (IMG) had acquired the rights to the series. IMG subsequently re-released the first two seasons on DVD.

On June 4, 2012, IMG announced that it would be releasing a complete series set, featuring all 224 remastered episodes. Release of this set never happened, and the rights to the series' home videos later moved to SFM Entertainment, which released The Real McCoys: The Complete Series on August 29, 2017 in Region 1. This is a manufacture-on-demand (MOD) release, available exclusively from Amazon.com.

Ratings

References

External links

 
 
 Production history and DVD review of Season 1

1957 American television series debuts
1963 American television series endings
1950s American sitcoms
1960s American sitcoms
American Broadcasting Company original programming
Black-and-white American television shows
CBS original programming
English-language television shows
Television series about families
Television shows set in Los Angeles County, California
Television shows set on farms
Inheritances in fiction